Joice Souza da Silva (born 20 July 1983, in Rio de Janeiro) is a Brazilian freestyle wrestler.

Career
Joice Silva competed in the freestyle 55 kg event at the 2012 Summer Olympics and was eliminated by Valeria Zholobova in the 1/8 finals.

Silva became the first Brazilian gold medalist in wrestling at the 2015 Pan American Games in Toronto, Ontario, Canada.

References

External links
 

1983 births
Living people
Sportspeople from Rio de Janeiro (city)
Brazilian female sport wrestlers
Olympic wrestlers of Brazil
Wrestlers at the 2012 Summer Olympics
Wrestlers at the 2016 Summer Olympics
Pan American Games gold medalists for Brazil
Pan American Games bronze medalists for Brazil
Pan American Games medalists in wrestling
Wrestlers at the 2011 Pan American Games
Wrestlers at the 2015 Pan American Games
Medalists at the 2011 Pan American Games
Medalists at the 2015 Pan American Games
20th-century Brazilian women
21st-century Brazilian women